Giorgio Emiliano Carrara (born 16 February 2001) is an Argentine racing driver who last competed in the 2022 USF Juniors season. He has previously competed in the FIA Formula 3 Championship.

Career

Karting
Carrara started karting in 2010 in Argentina at the age of 9 where he won a championship in 2015.

Italian Formula 4
In 2017, Carrara moved over to race in Europe for the first time when he made his single-seater debut in the Italian F4 Championship with Jenzer Motorsport. He finished 16th while finishing in the points three times, finishing on a total of six points. 
In 2018, Carrara improved on his previous year while staying with Jenzer he finished on the podium three times which helped with his 112 points that sat him in 7th to finish the championship.
Again staying with Jenzer in 2019, Carrara won his first italian F4 race at the Red Bull Ring after which Jenzer promoted him to their FIA F3 race seat, replacing Artem Petrov. Alders' highest finish was at the second race at Hockenheimring where he finished 5th, at the end of the season he finished 11th with 44 points.

Spanish Formula 4
Carrara first raced in Spanish F4 in 2019 where he only competed in 3 races for Jenzer. He won all 3 races and left the championship for the next round to compete at the Red Bull Ring for Jenzer in FIA F3. The only other driver to win all 3 races in a single round was eventual winner and fellow compatriot Franco Colapinto. Carrara finished in 11th place with 55 points.

FIA Formula 3
After his performance in the Spanish and Italian F4 championships in 2019, Jenzer gave Carrara a driver for them at Circuit Paul Ricard as a replacement for Artem Petrov. Due to visa complications Carrara was unable to attend the French Grand Prix but was able to race at the next race in Austria where he finished 28th and 21st respectively. More visa complications meant that Italian Federico Malvestiti replaced Carrara for the British Grand Prix at Silverstone. Carrara would go on to complete the season apart from the finale at Sochi Autodrom, where he would finish 30th with his highest finish of 16th.

Racing record

Career summary

† As Carrara was a guest driver, he was ineligible to score points.

Complete FIA Formula 3 Championship results
(key) (Races in bold indicate pole position; races in italics indicate points for the fastest lap of top ten finishers)

References

External links
 

Argentine racing drivers
FIA Formula 3 Championship drivers
ADAC Formula 4 drivers
Italian F4 Championship drivers
Living people
2001 births
Spanish F4 Championship drivers

Jenzer Motorsport drivers
Karting World Championship drivers
United States F4 Championship drivers
Sportspeople from Chaco Province